Khalid bin Mohammad Al Attiyah (born 9 March 1967) is a Qatari politician who was minister of foreign affairs from June 2013 to January 2016. He has been minister of state for defense since January 2016.

Early life and education
Al Attiyah was born on 9 March 1967. His family belong to the Banu Tamim tribe to which the ruling family of Qatar, the House of Thani, also belong. His father was the founder of the Qatar Armed Forces.

He received a bachelor's degree in air science from King Faisal Air Academy in 1987 and also, a law degree from Beirut Arab University in 1993. He holds a master's degree in public law (1991) and a PhD in law (2006), both of which he received from Cairo University.

Career
Al Attiyah started his career as a fighter pilot and joined Qatar's air force where he served from 1987 to 1995. He left the air force and established a law firm in 1995. From 2003 to 2008, he served as the president of the National Committee for Human Rights. During the same period he also owned a law firm.

Then he served as the minister of state for international cooperation from 2008 to 2011. During his tenure he also served as acting minister for business and trade. In 2009, he became a member of Silatech's board of trustees. He is also a member of the board of directors and chairman of the executive committee of the Diar company, and a member of the board of directors of the Qatar electricity and water company.

In a cabinet reshuffle in September 2011, Al Attiyah was appointed as minister of state for foreign affairs in the cabinet led by Prime Minister Hamad bin Jassim Al Thani. On 26 June 2013, Al Attiyah was named as the minister of foreign affairs in a cabinet reshuffle. He replaced Hamad bin Jassim Al Thani in the post. The cabinet is headed by Prime Minister Abdullah bin Nasser Al Thani.

In a cabinet reshuffle on 27 January 2016, Al Attiyah was replaced as minister of foreign affairs by Mohammed bin Abdulrahman Al Thani. In the same reshuffle Al Attiyah was appointed as minister of state for defense.

References

External links

20th-century businesspeople
21st-century businesspeople
21st-century Qatari politicians
1967 births
Beirut Arab University alumni
Cairo University alumni
Foreign ministers of Qatar
Government ministers of Qatar
Living people
Qatari businesspeople
Qatari military personnel